The 1996–97 Wichita Thunder season was the fifth season of the CHL franchise in Wichita, Kansas.

Regular season

Division standings

Note: y - clinched league title; x - clinched playoff spot; e - eliminated from playoff contention

Awards

Transactions
The Thunder were involved in the following transactions during the 1996–97 season.

Trades

See also
1996–97 CHL season

References

External links
1996–97 Wichita Thunder season at Hockey Database

Wichita Thunder seasons
Wich